Richard Farnum Winter is an American philatelist who signed the Roll of Distinguished Philatelists in 2008.

References

American philatelists
Signatories to the Roll of Distinguished Philatelists
Living people
Year of birth missing (living people)